Evening Shade is an unincorporated community in Scott County, in the U.S. state of Arkansas.

History
According to tradition, the community was named for the fact that nearby Poteau Mountain shaded the townsite in the evening sun.

References

Unincorporated communities in Arkansas
Unincorporated communities in Scott County, Arkansas